Ronald James Romanick (born November 6, 1960) is an American professional baseball pitcher and pitching coach. He is the minor league pitching coordinator for the New York Mets organization. Romanick played in Major League Baseball (MLB) for the California Angels from 1984 through 1986.  In 2011, he was the Oakland Athletics' pitching coach.

Early years
He was drafted by the Toronto Blue Jays in the third round of the 1979 Major League Baseball Draft, but did not sign, choosing instead to attend Arizona State University, where he played for the Arizona State Sun Devils baseball team.

Romanick finally said yes to the California Angels, who drafted him in the first round (fourth overall) of the  January Secondary Draft. He spent three seasons in their minor league system, compiling a 30-25 record and 3.89 earned run average in 71 starts.

Playing career
He won a roster spot with the Angels out of Spring training , going 12-12 with a 3.76 ERA his rookie season. Perhaps the biggest game Romanick ever pitched was on October 2, 1985 against the Kansas City Royals. Having once had a 6.5 game lead in their division, the Angels found themselves just one game up on the Kansas City Royals in the American League West when they headed to Royals Stadium for a four-game set on September 30. The Royals won the game on a three hit performance by Bud Black, and went on to win the division by a game.

Following the 1986 season, he was traded with a player to be named later (who would be Alan Mills) to the New York Yankees for Butch Wynegar. He spent the entire  season with the Yankees' triple A affiliate, the Columbus Clippers, where he went 5-8 with a 5.16 ERA. He spent the following season in the Milwaukee Brewers organization before retiring.

Coaching career
Romanick worked as a minor league pitching coordinator and coach with the Seattle Mariners organization from  through . He worked as minor league roving pitching instructor for the Athletics from  through . On October 17, 2007, the A's promoted Romanick to the parent club as their bullpen coach, replacing Brad Fischer.

On November 1, 2010, Romanick was named the pitching coach for the Athletics when Curt Young left to become the new pitching coach for the Boston Red Sox. Romanick was not retained after the 2011 season as manager Bob Melvin opted to have coaches of his own. The New York Mets hired Romanick as their minor league pitching coordinator in December 2011.

References

General
2006 Oakland Athletics Media Guide. Pg. 358. Produced by the Oakland Athletics Public Relations Department.

External links 

Ron Romanick at Baseball Almanac

1960 births
Living people
American expatriate baseball players in Canada
Arizona State Sun Devils baseball players
Baseball coaches from Idaho
Baseball players from Idaho
California Angels players
Columbus Clippers players
Denver Zephyrs players
Edmonton Trappers players
Holyoke Millers players
Major League Baseball bullpen coaches
Major League Baseball pitching coaches
Major League Baseball pitchers
Nashua Angels players
Oakland Athletics coaches
People from Burley, Idaho
Redwood Pioneers players
Stockton Ports players
Alaska Goldpanners of Fairbanks players